Ulbugay (Ulbagai) is a rural locality (an ulus) in Tunkinsky District, Republic of Buryatia, Russia. The population was 92 as of 2010. There are 5 streets.

Geography 
Ulbugay is located 62 km northeast of Kyren (the district's administrative centre) by road. Tagarkhay is the nearest rural locality.

References 

Rural localities in Tunkinsky District